Marie Oliver may refer to:
 K. K. Beck (born 1950), American novelist who used this pseudonym
 Marie Watkins Oliver (1854-1944), American designer of Missouri state flag
 Olga Kosakiewicz, French actress who used this stage name